Notostira elongata is a species of bugs from a Miridae family, subfamily Mirinae. It is found everywhere in Europe except for Albania, Andorra, Bosnia and Herzegovina, various islands (except Britain I., where it is abundant).

Description
The species have longitudinal furrow between the eyes, and are yellowish-green. Their prothorax is unpunctured and smooth, with dense dark hairs.

Ecology
The species live two generations. The females change colour in fall, by becoming pinker, and larger. Both male and female species mate during winter, following by an egg development in spring.

References

Miridae
Insects described in 1785
Hemiptera of Europe